Phaedimus of Bisanthe (2nd century BC) was an ancient Greek poet from Bisanthe (eastern Thrace) and author of an epic, called the Heracleia according to Athenaeus. In the introduction of the Garland of Meleager, l. 51. (Greek Anthology xiii), where Meleagre mentions the poets whom he anthologized, he is mentioned as The yellow iris of Phaedimus. The four poems attributed to him in the Greek Anthology include a dedication and an epitaph.

References
About.com
Ancient Library

Ancient Thracian Greeks
2nd-century BC Greek people
Ancient Greek epic poets
2nd-century BC poets
Epigrammatists of the Greek Anthology